Joseph W. Esherick (Chinese name: , born 1942) is an emeritus professor of modern Chinese history at the University of California, San Diego. He is the holder of the Hwei-chih and Julia Hsiu Chair in Chinese Studies. Esherick is a graduate of Harvard College (1964, summa cum laude). He received his Ph.D. from University of California, Berkeley (1971), under the supervision of Joseph R. Levenson and Frederic Wakeman.

In addition to publishing research monographs, Esherick published a series of essays on historiography and reviews of the large questions in modern Chinese history. As a member of the Committee of Concerned Asian Scholars, for instance, Esherick in 1972 published a critique of the field and of his undergraduate professor, John K. Fairbank, "Harvard on Imperialism."  Later such essays dealt with the Revolution of 1911, Chiang Kai-shek, and the Revolution of 1949.

Publications

Books

 Modern China: The Story of a Revolution, co-authored with Orville Schell (Knopf and Vintage, 1972).
 Lost Chance in China: The World War II Despatches of John S. Service (Random House, 1974; Vintage paperback, 1975).
 Reform and Revolution in China: the 1911 Revolution in Hunan and Hubei (University of California Press, 1976; paperback: 1986; Chinese translation: Zhong-hua Publishing House, 1982; second edition: University of Michigan Press, 2002).
 The Origins of the Boxer Uprising (University of California Press, 1987; Chinese translation: Jiangsu People's Press, 1994). 
 Winner of 1987 John K. Fairbank Prize from American Historical Association; 1989 Joseph Levenson Book Prize from the Association for Asian Studies; and the 1989 Berkeley Prize from the University of California Press.
 Chinese Local Elites and Patterns of Dominance (University of California Press, 1990), co-edited with Mary B. Rankin.

 Chinese Archives: An Introductory Guide, co-edited with Ye Wa (Berkeley: University of California Institute of East Asian Studies, 1996).
 Remaking the Chinese City: Modernity and National Identity, 1900–1950, edited volume. (University of Hawaii Press, 2000).
 Ancestral Leaves: A Family Journey through Chinese History'' (University of California Press, 2011).

Major Articles

 "Harvard on China: The Apologetics of Imperialism," Bulletin of Concerned Asian Scholars 4:4 (December 1972).
 "1911: A Review," the lead article of a symposium on 1911 in Modern China 2:2 (April 1976).
 "The 'Restoration of Capitalism' in Mao's and Marxist Theory," Modern China 5:1 (January 1979).
 "From Feudalism to Capitalism: Japanese Scholarship on the Transformation of Chinese Rural Society," co-authored with Linda Grove, Modern China 6:4 (October 1980).
 "Number Games: A Note on Land Distribution in Prerevolutionary China," Modern China 7:4 (October 1981)
 "Acting Out Democracy: Political Theater in Modern China," co-authored with Jeffrey Wasserstrom. Journal of Asian Studies, November 1990.
 "Founding a Republic, Electing a President: How Sun Yat-sen Became Guofu," in Harold Shiffrin and Eto Shinkichi, eds., China's Republican Revolution (Tokyo: University of Tokyo Press, 1994): pp. 129–152.
 "Deconstructing the Construction of the Party-State: Gulin County in the Shaan-Gan-Ning Border Region," China Quarterly, No. 140 (December 1994): 1052–1079.
 "Ten Theses on the Chinese Revolution," Modern China 21.1 (January 1995): 45–76
 "Cherishing Sources from Afar," Modern China 24.2 (April 1998)
 "Revolution in a Feudal Fortress: Yangjiagou Mizhi County, Shaanxi, 1937–1948," Modern China 24.4 (October 1998): 339–377
 "War and Revolution: Chinese Society During the 1940s," Twentieth-Century China 27.1 (November 2001): 1–37

References

External links
UCSD Chinese Studies Program

American sinologists
Historians of China
Living people
Harvard College alumni
University of California, Berkeley alumni
Year of birth missing (living people)